Samantha James is an American dance pop singer from Los Angeles, known for her style of blending downtempo to uptempo dance music, with soulful vocal styles. She released her debut album, Rise, in 2007 through Om Records. The title track from the album was released as a single the year prior, and reached No. 1 on the US Billboard Hot Dance Club Songs chart.

Life and career
The daughter of Melanie Lee Rose, and granddaughter of musician David Rose, James grew up with different types of music. During her teens, she became heavily involved in the underground dance scene in Los Angeles. Her influences include Pat Metheny, Sade, Tracey Thorn, Lady Miss Kier, Madonna, Esthero, Morcheeba, Bebel Gilberto, Basia, and Róisín Murphy.

At the age of 13, James lost her mother to breast cancer, after an eight-year battle with the disease. After eight years of working on her music, she met Sebastian Arocha Morton, who worked with artists such as Sting, Vikter Duplaix, and Fischerspooner. When she met Morton, James was determined to be different from other artists. After a while, James and Morton came up with a mix of soulful and electronic music and continued on that path.

James and friend Dave Curtin discussed which label would be good for her music and came up with Om Records. When they contacted the label and sent them a demo of her song "Rise", she was signed on to a single deal. After a while, she was signed to do a full-length album. When she released her first single "Rise" in 2006, it reached No. 1 on the Billboard Hot Dance Club Songs chart. Shortly after releasing her debut album, she toured around the world.

In 2009, James announced that she was working on a new album named Subconscious. James later stated that just before Rise was released, her father died and she took some time off before producing material for the new album. On the new album she worked with producer (and old school friend) Shane Drasin since Morton was busy working on other projects. On June 22, 2010, James released the album.

James released the song "Wings of Faith", dedicated to Japan, due to the tsunami in March 2011.

Discography
 Rise (2007)
 Subconscious (2010)

See also
List of number-one dance hits (United States)
List of artists who reached number one on the US Dance chart

References

External links
Samantha James on Facebook
Samantha James on Discogs

21st-century American women singers
American contemporary R&B singers
American dance musicians
American electronic musicians
American women pop singers
American women singer-songwriters
American house musicians
American people of British-Jewish descent
American pop musicians
American rhythm and blues singer-songwriters
American sopranos
American soul singers
American women in electronic music
Chill-out musicians
Dance-pop musicians
Downtempo musicians
Jewish American musicians
Jewish women singers
Living people
People from Greater Los Angeles
Singers from Los Angeles
Year of birth missing (living people)
21st-century American singers
21st-century American Jews
Singer-songwriters from California
Women in electronic music